Koko/Besse is a Local Government Area in Kebbi State, Nigeria. Its headquarters are in Koko town. The town was founded by Mallam Mamman Dan-Gindi, a grand son of Mallam Abdulsalami Bagimbane. The majority inhabitants of Koko/Besse are Gimbanawa and Fulani tribes.

It has an area of 1,299 km and a population of 154,605 at the 2006 census.

The postal code of the area is 871.

References

Local Government Areas in Kebbi State